Munson Township is one of twenty-four townships in Henry County, Illinois, USA.  As of the 2010 census, its population was 400 and it contained 132 housing units.  Munson changed its name from Centre township on April 13, 1857.

Geography

Adjacent townships
 Geneseo Township (north)
 Atkinson Township (northeast)
 Cornwall Township (east)
 Burns Township (southeast)
 Cambridge Township (south)
 Andover Township (southwest)
 Osco Township (west)

Cemeteries
The township contains these two cemeteries: Greenlee and Munson.

Major highways
  Illinois Route 82

Demographics

School districts
 Cambridge Community Unit School District 227
 Geneseo Community Unit School District 228

Political districts
 Illinois's 14th congressional district
 State House District 71
 State House District 74
 State Senate District 36
 State Senate District 37

References
 United States Census Bureau 2008 TIGER/Line Shapefiles
 
 United States National Atlas

External links
 City-Data.com
 Illinois State Archives
 Township Officials of Illinois

Townships in Henry County, Illinois
Townships in Illinois